"Honestly" is a song by American rock band Hot Chelle Rae. It was released as the third single from their second album Whatever on March 22, 2012. The song was written by Ryan Follese, Nash Overstreet, Ian Keaggy, C. Kelly, Sam Hollander, Dave Katz and produced by S*A*M and Sluggo, Chad Royce, and Scott Mann.

Music video
The music video for the song was released on March 23, 2012 and featuring actress Ashley Benson from Pretty Little Liars.

Track listing

Credits and personnel
Lead vocals – Hot Chelle Rae
Producers – S*A*M and Sluggo, Chad Royce, Scott Mann
Lyrics – Ryan Follese, Nash Overstreet, Ian Keaggy, C. Kelly, Sam Hollander, Dave Katz
Label: RCA Records

Chart performance

References

2012 singles
2011 songs
Hot Chelle Rae songs
Columbia Records singles
Songs written by Claude Kelly
Songs written by Sam Hollander
Songs written by Dave Katz
Song recordings produced by S*A*M and Sluggo
Songs written by Keith Follesé